CN Aurel Vlaicu București, commonly known as Aurel Vlaicu București or simply CNAV, is a Romanian basketball club based in Bucharest, currently participates in the Liga Națională, the top-tier league in Romania.

The club initially played in the second-tier Liga I. However, in 2018 the league was merged with the top-tier Liga Națională.

Current roster

References

External links

Sport in Bucharest
1923 establishments in Romania
Basketball teams in Romania
Basketball teams established in 1923